Travis Bracht is a Seattle-based singer and guitarist best known for his work with the post-grunge band Second Coming.

Biography

Peace and Silence
In 1990, Bracht formed the band Peace and Silence along with guitarists Rich Henry and Tim Lynch, bassist Chuck Miller, and drummer Fred Kitchens. This group released an album called Fathom That in 1993 before breaking up a few years later, reuniting for a one-time show a decade later.

Second Coming
After the break-up of Peace and Silence, Bracht joined bassist Johnny Bacolas and drummer James Bergstrom in the band Second Coming along with former Sweet Water guitarist Dudley Taft. Before they were in Second Coming, Bacolas and Bergstrom had also formed the rhythm section of Alice N' Chains, a precursor to Alice in Chains that also featured Layne Staley on vocals. Staley had made a guest appearance on L.O.V.Evil, the first album put out by Second Coming before Bracht joined them. When Staley died in 2002, Second Coming performed at the very first annual Layne Staley Tribute and Benefit Concert held later that year.

In 1998, Capitol Records put out the eponymous Second Coming, the first album featuring the Bracht-led lineup, which brought the band considerable attention. This album produced two singles titled "Soft" and "Vintage Eyes", the latter of which had a music video. Another track titled "Unknown Rider" was included on the soundtrack for the blockbuster film The Sixth Sense.

After dealing with a rather acrimonious split from both Capitol Records and Dudley Taft in the early 2000s, Second Coming regrouped with new guitarist Eric Snyder and began recording their next album 13, which was released through Timestyle music in 2003 along with a companion EP titled Acoustic.

Soulbender
In 2007, Bracht reunited with his former Peace and Silence bandmate Chuck Miller in Soulbender, filling in for his friend Nick Pollock on vocals. Pollock had also played alongside Bacolas, Bergstrom, and Staley in Alice N' Chains; he was their guitar player. The Pollock-led lineup of Soulbender had also played at the very first Layne Staley Tribute held in 2002. The Bracht-led lineup followed suit by performing at the sixth tribute held in 2007 with Bracht sharing vocal duties with Chris Daughtry as they performed the song "Sunshine" by Alice in Chains. Later that year, Soulbender released the song "Loaded", their only released material thus far with Bracht on vocals, on the compilation album Unleashed 3 alongside several other heavy metal artists.

Post Modern Heroes
In May 2009, Bracht formed a new band called Post Modern Heroes along with every other member of his previous band Peace and Silence, except for Chuck Miller. They had a different bass player who was identified only as Robot, who previously played in the band Omnivoid along with Bracht's former Second Coming bandmate Dudley Taft. In 2010, PMH independently released their eponymous debut album, Post Modern Heroes, which was well received by Seattle rock radio station KISW. They would be picked to share the stage with old friends from Second Coming touring days, Sevendust, Godsmack and Puddle of Mudd at KISW Pain In The Grass that summer. The band would dissolve in 2012.

Bruiser Brody
Glenn Cannon from Seattle-based band Windowpane brought Travis back into the Seattle scene along with guitarist JT Philips, drummer Steve Migs, and bassist Jeff Rouse. They named themselves after the wrestler, Bruiser Brody. They released an EP in October 2016, and released their first full album Everyone's Dead in November 2018, which included a cover of Post Modern Heroes' "Heart Krusher".

The Last Funeral (Solo Album)
On New Years Day 2020, The Last Funeral was released with the help of crowd funding. This, according to Bracht, was written to be an open suicide note to the world (complete with the EKG sounds at the end of the final track). After the devastating loss of good friend, Shawn Smith, Bracht entered the famous London Bridge Studios the next week and recorded the album in one weekend. So as to preserve the honesty and character in the music, Bracht spent no more than two takes on vocals. The entire album was recorded "glassless" with everyone in the same room. Bracht wanted to display this record "warts and all". Coincidentally, on the track, "Wrapped In My Memory", which was written by Smith for his good friend, Andrew Wood of Mother Love Bone, Bracht recorded the song in one take on the same piano Wood recorded "Crown of Thorns" with. Upon listening to Bracht's version, it is obvious to the listener that he is trying his best to contain his emotions as he flows through the song, crying in some parts. Bracht cites heavy depression and mental illness as the fuel for this effort. Upon going forward with recording, Bracht thought it best to include some of the people who were instrumental in helping him on his path through life, including producer, Kelly Gray (Second Coming, Candlebox, Brother Cane), James Bergstrom and Dudley Taft. Also included: JT Phillips (guitar), Kyyle Cort (Piano), Jake Carden (Bass), Tor Dietrichson (Tablas/Congas) and Indrajit Banerjee (Sitar).  Bracht also includes a long overdue song to his son, Triston Bracht (who makes a cameo in the title track). When asked about the content and meaning of the album, Bracht simply stated, "I was planning on killing myself after this one".

Discography
Peace and Silence discography

Second Coming discography

Post Modern Heroes discography

Bruiser Brody discography

Solo discography

Other appearances

References

Second Coming (band) members
American rock musicians
American rock singers
Musicians from Seattle
United States Army soldiers
Living people
1972 births
Singers from Washington (state)
Soulbender members
21st-century American male singers
21st-century American singers